Reinhard Theimer (28 February 1948 – 3 September 2020) was an East German hammer thrower. He competed for the sports club TSC Berlin during his active career.

International competitions

References

1948 births
2020 deaths
Athletes from Berlin
German male hammer throwers
East German male hammer throwers
Olympic athletes of East Germany
Athletes (track and field) at the 1968 Summer Olympics
Athletes (track and field) at the 1972 Summer Olympics
European Athletics Championships medalists